Licensed radio broadcasting in Ireland is one element of the wider media of Ireland, with 85% of the population listening to a licensed radio broadcasting service on any given day.

History
A Morse code transmission on 24 April 1916 from the General Post Office in Dublin by the rebels during the Easter Rising is considered the first broadcast in Ireland.  Regular radio broadcasting in Ireland began with 2RN's test transmissions in 1925.  2RN has since become RTÉ Radio 1, which celebrated 80 years of uninterrupted broadcasting in January 2006, making it amongst the oldest continuously operating (if not the actual oldest), continuously public service radio station in Europe.  RTÉ Raidió na Gaeltachta joined in 1972, and RTÉ Radio 2, now 2FM, launched in 1979.

Commercial radio was outlawed in Ireland until 1989, leading to the development of Irish pirate radio.  Upon legalisation, licences were advertised and awarded on a franchise system explained in the article for a national service and a network of regional services covering the country.  These all took to the air during 1989 and 1990, and although the national service (Century) eventually failed, all the local services lasted until their licence was revoked, or still exist.  Additional licences have been added on an erratic basis since the late 1990s.

An 'international' service, Atlantic 252, also operated on long wave between 1989 and 2002, although it was aimed solely at the United Kingdom and Ireland.  It was never subject to the authority of the Broadcasting Authority of Ireland (BAI), and was operated under RTÉ's remit as a joint venture between RTÉ and CLT-UFA.  After a short period as a sports station (TeamTalk), the frequencies reverted to sole RTÉ control and are now used as an additional frequency for RTÉ Radio 1.

In Ireland, Community Radio has been active since the late 1970s.  However, it took until 1994 before the Independent Radio and Television Commission established an 18-month community radio pilot project to explore and evaluate the potential offered by community broadcasting in an Irish context.  This project went operational in 1995, when licenses were issued to eleven community and community of interest groups across the country.  2004 saw the establishment of CRAOL the Community Radio Forum of Ireland.

Licensing
Aside from the stations operated by Raidió Teilifís Éireann (RTÉ), radio stations in Ireland operate under sound broadcasting contracts issued by the Broadcasting Authority of Ireland (BAI). This body supervises and regulates the commercial Independent National, Regional, and Local Radio stations, as well as the non-profit Community Radio stations, Institutional Services and Temporary Services. After the Broadcasting Act 2009, the BAI now is responsible for RTÉ also.

Transmission
All stations broadcast on FM and RTÉ Radio also broadcasts on long wave which is mainly intended for reception outside Ireland.  RTÉ radio services are also available free-to-air on digital satellite, as is Newstalk, and a number of recently licensed services or applicants have used satellite transmission to homes as part of the licence applications.

Medium wave (AM) licences were issued for new commercial stations for Limerick and Galway in 2002, although these services never reached the air (with the licences being withdrawn); and a medium wave licence has been awarded for a quasi-national religious service Spirit Radio.

During 2006, a group, Choice FM, applied for and received permission to broadcasting on MW in the Dublin area over a period of thirty days. The 'easy listening' radio station relayed its FM programming on 1278 kHz MW, and operated opt-out programming at various times. The group is said to be interested in obtaining one of the four MW channels that are allocated to the Dublin area, however the BAI's future schedule for licensing does not indicate that any MW licences will be offered on a permanent basis.

During 2007, a radio station called 'The Rock' obtained a temporary 'classic rock' music service. The station broadcast on 94.9 FM and also on 1278 kHz MW. The Rock was operated by the same group that operated Choice FM during 2005 and 2006, although different MW facilities were used by the group during 2007.

Ownership
Raidió Teilifís Éireann and Bauer Media Audio Ireland dominate the national radio broadcasting sector. RTÉ operates Radio 1, Radio 2FM, the Irish Language station RnaG, and classical station Lyric FM. The two national commercial stations are both owned by Bauer Media Audio Ireland - Today FM and Newstalk.

Ownership rules were relaxed in the mid-2000s, which saw several companies buying up local and national commercial stations, including Scottish Radio Holdings, who sold their stations to Emap, who eventually sold on those stations to Denis O'Brien's Communicorp. The ownership of commercial radio in Ireland is largely by two companies; Bauer Media Audio Ireland which owns two national, one regional and two local stations, and Wireless Group, which owns six local stations.

The rest of the stations, mostly small services, are generally owned by local businesses, with notable proprietors of stakes including Thomas Crosbie Holdings, the Roman Catholic Church and the Mid Western Area Health Board.

Until 31 March 2021, RTÉ also broadcast six DAB stations. These stations are now available via other digital platforms.

Local Radio owners
Bauer Media Audio Ireland - 98FM and SPIN 1038
Wireless Group - FM104, Dublin's Q102, Cork's 96FM, C103, Limerick's Live 95 and LMFM
Raidió Phobail Chiarraí Teoranta - Radio Kerry, Shannonside FM, Tipp FM, Clare FM
Tindle Radio Group - Midlands 103
Connacht Tribune - Galway Bay FM

National stations

RTÉ (national public service broadcaster)

Independent national radio
Today FM (formerly Radio Ireland) - popular music with some speech programming
Newstalk  - news and talk radio
Radio Maria Ireland - religious radio on the digital terrestrial platform

Multi-city and county radio
Broadcasting to Greater Dublin (Dublin city and county; limited parts of County Kildare, County Meath and County Wicklow), Cork city and county, Limerick city and county, Galway city and county and County Clare:
Classic Hits Radio - music service for over-45s
Spirit Radio - Christian and religious service aimed at over-15s; launched on 27 January 2011 with FM frequencies in the cities of Dublin, Cork, Limerick, Galway and Waterford. In July 2012 the station as required by its licence introduced its planned AM transmission on 549 kHz medium wave to increase coverage to nationwide.

Independent regional radio

Independent regional radio
Beat 102-103 - Counties Carlow, Kilkenny, Waterford, Wexford and South Tipperary.
Spin South West - Counties Kerry, Clare, Limerick, North Tipperary, and south west Laois.
iRadio (NW) - Counties Galway, Mayo, Longford, Roscommon, Sligo, Leitrim and Donegal.
iRadio (NE and Midlands) - Counties Kildare, Meath, North Laois, Carlow, Louth, Westmeath, Offaly, Cavan and Monaghan.

All services are licensed for 'youth' content, no franchises area geographically overlap, and the entire country is served apart from County Wicklow and the cities and counties of Cork and Dublin, both of which have 'youth' licensed services (Red FM and SPIN 1038 respectively).  Beat 102-103 was the first to air, and was a pilot for the rest of the system.

In 2011, i102-104 and i105-107 merged to become one iRadio entity.

Independent local radio
There are 25 commercial stations (Independent Local Radio - ILR) licensed on a regional franchise basis. Often several counties of Ireland are covered by one station only, but Dublin and Cork have several. The majority of the ILR stations collectively own the sales house, Independent Radio Sales.

Dublin ILRs
Except for the two original ILR licenses - 98FM and FM104 - each additional ILR license in Dublin was awarded for a specific format, intending on meeting demands which it was felt that 98FM and FM104 were not catering to. The majority of stations heard in Dublin can also be heard in North East Kildare, South Meath and North Wicklow.

98FM - general service
Radio Nova 100FM (Ireland) - classic rock music service; the Original Radio Nova (Ireland) International, Ireland's first Superpirate station by the same name previously broadcast in Dublin from 1981 - 1988
Dublin's Q102 - service aimed at older listeners (35+); renamed in 2004, formerly 'Lite FM'. A pirate station by the same name previously broadcast in Dublin from 1985 - 1988
SPIN 1038 - service aimed at youth (initially licensed for dance music).
FM104 - general service; formerly 'Rock 104' and 'Capital Radio' 104.4FM
Sunshine 106.8 - easy listening service; renamed in 2010 - formerly 'Dublin's Country'/'Country Mix'. A Superpirate station called The Red Hot Sound Of Sunshine 101 previously broadcast in Dublin from 1980 - 1988.

Cork ILRs
96FM and C103 (dual franchise) - C103 is aimed at older listeners, also sports and rural interest programmes.
Red FM - Corks Number 1 Radio Station Hot A/C format.

Leinster (excluding Dublin) ILRs
East Coast FM - County Wicklow
KCLR 96FM - Counties Carlow and Kilkenny
Kfm - County Kildare
South East Radio - County Wexford
Midlands 103 and Midlands Gold - Counties Laois, Offaly, and Westmeath (split service)
LMFM - Counties Meath and Louth

Munster (excluding Cork) ILRs
WLR FM - Waterford City & County
Clare FM - County Clare
Live 95FM - Limerick City and County
Tipp FM - County Tipperary
Radio Kerry - County Kerry

Connacht/Ulster ILRs
Galway Bay FM - Galway City and County; commercial radio station 
Ocean FM - County Sligo, North Leitrim, and South Donegal.
MidWest Radio - County Mayo
Shannonside FM - Counties Longford, Roscommon, East Galway and South Leitrim. Dual franchise with Northern Sound Radio, covering Counties Cavan and Monaghan.
Highland Radio - County Donegal.

Community radio
Community Radio covers specific local communities or communities of interest. These operate on a non-commercial basis. In Ireland, the BAI requires that community radio stations subscribe to the World Association of Community Radio Broadcasters (AMARC) Community Radio Charter for Europe. Community radio in Ireland is represented by CRAOL. Currently there are 20 fully licensed community radio stations on air in Ireland, with offers of contracts from the Broadcasting Authority of Ireland, while there are 42 stations in the process of obtaining a licence.
Belfield FM - University College Dublin
Cavan Community Radio - Cavan, County Cavan
Claremorris Community Radio - Claremorris, County Mayo
Connemara Community Radio - Letterfrack, County Galway
Cork Campus Radio 98.3 - studio located at University College Cork but is licensed for the general student population of Cork City
CRC FM (Community Radio Castlebar) - Castlebar, County Mayo
CRY 104.0FM (Community Radio Youghal) - Youghal, County Cork
Dublin South FM - County Dublin
Dundalk FM 97.7 - Dundalk, County Louth
Flirt FM - Galway NUIG
ICR FM (Inishowen Community Radio) - Carndonagh, County Donegal; now known as Inishowen Live.
LifeFM - County Cork
Liffey Sound FM - Lucan, County Dublin
Near FM (North East Access Radio) - County Dublin
Phoenix FM - Blanchardstown, County Dublin
Radio Corca Baiscinn - Kilkee, County Clare
Raidió Na Life - Dublin (Irish language station)
RosFm - County Roscommon
TCR FM ("Tramore Community Radio") - Tramore, County Waterford
Tipperary Mid-West Community Radio - County Tipperary
ULFM - University of Limerick
West Dublin Access Radio - County Dublin
West Limerick 102 - County Limerick
Wired FM - Limerick, County Limerick
Westport Radio WRFM 98.2 - Westport, County Mayo
BCRfm Ballina Community radio - Ballina, County Mayo
Eden 102.5 fm - Edenderry, County Offaly

Special interest services
Special interest services resemble ILRs in most ways, but must be of specialist interest — e.g. heavier local interest content, or specialist music. Only one such station is licensed, Dublin City FM, which brand themselves as 103.2 Dublin City FM on-air, and DUB CITY on RDS.  Dublin City FM are essentially a community station with specialist traffic reports around rush-hour periods.

Institutional services

The BAI may also issue licenses to institutions, such as hospitals and colleges, for the provision of low-powered FM services.  At present, there are five such stations in operation; all of them are hospital radio stations, with the existing student radio stations operating under community radio or temporary licenses.
CUH FM Hospital Radio - (102.0FM) - Cork University Hospital, Cork, County Cork.
Mater Hospital Radio - Mater Hospital, Dublin, County Dublin.
Dreamtime 92.6FM - S.O.S. Kilkenny Ltd, Callan Road, Kilkenny, Co. Kilkenny.
South Tipperary General Hospital Radio 93.7FM - South Tipperary General and Maternity Hospital, Clonmel, County Tipperary.
St. Ita's Hospital Radio - St. Ita's Hospital, Portrane, County Dublin.

Temporary services
Stations may also be licensed to operate for shorter periods, with temporary licenses allowing stations to operate for up to thirty days in a given twelve-month period.  These licenses may be used by stations providing a service to coincide with local, cultural and sporting events or festivals.  Another group of stations to avail of this type of license are those that are being run as pilot projects; successful stations may later be established as Community Radio stations, or run for a permanent license.

One such temporary licence station was Sunrise Radio, which broadcast poly-lingual programming in the Dublin area for several months from March 2006. While its licence was renewed for the following year, it was not made permanent, and the broadcast frequency later allocated to another station.

Defunct stations

RTÉ radio
Atlantic 252 - a joint venture with RTL, eventually failed financially.
RTÉ FM3 Classical music/arts service, had existed prior to the launch of Lyric FM. FM3 time-shared the same national FM network as RnaG, resulting in limited broadcasting hours.
RTÉ Radio Cork, (was originally 'RTÉ Cork Local Radio', changed name in 1989 to 'Cork 89FM', and relaunched again in 1994 as 'RTÉ Radio Cork') - an opt-out of Radio 1 for the Cork area on medium wave and secondary FM transmitters, closed in 1999 due to declining interest.
RTÉ mobile Community Radio station, existed during the late 1970s and 1980s, this mobile station provided temporary community radio services to towns and cities around the country.
Millennium 88FM temporary local radio service for Dublin during 1988 and part of 1989 to mark 1988 at the year of the Dublin Millennium.
RTÉ Digital Radio Sport, a rolling service in the early days of DAB.
RTÉ Choice, international and national speech service with drama, documentary, arts, world news. Merged in 2013 with RTÉ Radio 1 Extra.

Independent national radio
Century Radio - failed financially, closed in 1991.

Independent local radio
Limerick 95 FM (Radio Limerick One) (95 MHz FM); lost franchise mid-term for stated misbehaviour - subsequently operated on a pirate basis.
CKR FM and Radio Kilkenny - franchises redrawn at end of contract, Kildare area awarded to KFM, Carlow and Kilkenny to KCLR.  Gentrification of Kildare by Dublin commuters led Carlow to be closer aligned with Kilkenny in the eyes of the BAI, hence the changing of the franchise areas
Tipperary Mid-West Radio - held a very small franchise for South West Tipperary. Its franchise was merged with the rest of Tipperary franchise (held by Tipp FM). The station continues, being re-licensed as a Community Radio station.
North West Radio - subsidiary of Mid West Radio; replaced by Ocean FM at end of contract.
Easy 103 - held a licence for part of Wicklow and Horizon Radio held a licence for north Wicklow.  These two stations merged to become East Coast FM.
Fresh 95.5 - short lived North Dublin-targeted station from LMFM; was licensed to Meath only, relying on signal overspill.
TXFM (formerly Phantom 105.2); alternative rock music station for the Dublin area.

Community radio
Cashel Community Radio - Cashel, County Tipperary was a splinter group from Tipperary Mid-West Radio.
Tallaght FM - Tallaght, Dublin closed 2008.
9-7-11 FM - Dublin North West's community radio, (named after the area's postal districts) existed in the mid-1990s.
Dublin Weekend Radio - station that broadcast from Dublin City University in the 1990s, it time-shared transmission with Raidio na Life. Facilities are now used by DCU.
Inishowen Community Radio (ICR-FM) in north Co. Donegal, ceased broadcasts in October 2012.
Ballyhoura Community Radio (BCR) based in Charleville near the Cork/Limerick border. Went on air in May 2011, closed in March 2013. Frequency was 92.6 FM.
East Limerick Community Radio.  FM Frequencies were 96.8 (main) and 97.3.

Institutional services
Beaumont Hospital Radio - Beaumont Hospital, Beamount, Dublin. Closed in 2007.
Vibe 107.4FM - was a student service in Waterford I.T.
Regional Hospital Radio 94.2 - Mid-Western Regional Hospital, Limerick, County Limerick. Closed in 2018

Radio Oglaigh na h-Éireann
Radio Oglaigh na h-Éireann was established in 1962 to provide a short wave service to Irish Defence Forces serving in United Nations peacekeeping missions in Congo. Daily broadcasts were made on 17.544 MHz at 17:30 UTC, using a transmitter located at the Curragh Camp. Programmes, which were provided by Radio Éireann, included news, sports results, music and drama, including The Kennedys of Castleross. The service was discontinued after several years, when the Irish peacekeeping mission in Congo terminated.

See also
Digital Radio in the Republic of Ireland
List of Irish language radio stations
List of Irish newspapers
Television in Ireland

References

External links
The Broadcasting Authority of Ireland (BAI) The Authority licenses independent broadcasting services in Ireland
 Radiowaves.FM a database resource listing every radio station ever to broadcast in Ireland